Papyrus 104 (in the Gregory-Aland numbering), designated by the symbol 𝔓104, is a fragment that is part of a leaf from a papyrus codex, it measures 2.5 by 3.75 inches (6.35 by 9.5 cm) at its widest. It is conserved in the Papyrology Rooms at Sackler Library, Oxford, UK. The front (recto) contains lines from the Gospel of Matthew 21:34-37, in Greek, the back (verso) contains tentative traces of lines from verses 43 and 45.

Description 
This papyrus ranks among the earliest surviving texts of Matthew. It consists of six verses from the Gospel of Matthew, in a fragmentary condition, and is dated from early to late 2nd century.
The text of the manuscript concurs with the NA27/UBS4 (Greek New Testaments) completely, with the exception that it does not include Matthew 21:44. This verse is also omitted in manuscripts: Codex Bezae, Minuscule 33, some Old-Latin manuscripts, Syriac Sinaiticus (syrs), Diatessaron. However, it is included in Sinaiticus, Vaticanus, Ephraemi, Regius, Washingtonianus, and Dublinensis. This verse thus belongs to the so-called Western non-interpolations, making 𝔓104 the earliest witness to the interpolated nature of this verse.

Greek text
The papyrus is written on both sides, and the surviving portion also includes part of the top and outer margins of the page. Since the text for the verso is nearly illegible, only the text for the recto is given. The characters that are in bold style are the ones that can be seen in Papyrus 𝔓104.

Gospel of Matthew 21:34-37 (recto)

A total of 110 legible letters are visible on the recto side of the fragment, representing 18 out of the 24 letters of the Greek Alphabet; zeta, theta, xi, phi, chi, and psi being missing. "The scribe uses rough breathings, but no other lectional feature or punctuation is found". The hand is 'early', i.e., before c. 250. It is very carefully written, with extensive use of serifs.

See also 
 List of New Testament papyri
 Matthew 21
 Oxyrhynchus Papyri

References

Further reading 

 Thomas, J. David. The Oxyrhynchus Papyri LXIV (London: 1997), pp. 7–9.

External links 
 Oxyrhynchus Online, P.Oxy.LXIV 4404
 University of Münster,New Testament Transcripts Prototype. Select P104 from 'Manuscript descriptions' box
 „Fortsetzung der Liste der Handschriften“ Institut für Neutestamentliche Textforschung, Universität Münster. (PDF-Datei; 147 kB)

New Testament papyri
2nd-century biblical manuscripts
Early Greek manuscripts of the New Testament
Gospel of Matthew papyri